The Life Organisation were a short lived Australian jazz ensemble in the early 1970s. The group had two singles peak within the Australian top 100.

Discography

Singles

References

Musical groups established in 1973
Musical groups disestablished in 1974
1973 establishments in Australia
1974 disestablishments in Australia